Mark Ian John Lemon (born 12 February 1973) is an Australian speedway rider who has had a long career in British speedway and has won the Victoria State Championship on three occasions. Lemon is currently the Manager of both the Senior and Under-21 Australian speedway teams. He is also the manager of the Belle Vue Aces in the SGB Premiership.

Biography
Born in Bairnsdale, Victoria, Mark Lemon took up speedway at the age of twelve. 

He began his career in British speedway in 1990, riding for Poole Pirates in the team that won the British League Division Two. He rode for Poole again in 1991 but more regularly for Middlesbrough Bears, for whom he also rode in 1992. Swindon Robins attempted for the next three seasons to sign Lemon, but he was denied a work permit. He won the Victoria State Championship in 1992/93, winning again in 1995/96 and 2011/12, and after finishing in sixth place in the Australian Championship in the 1995/96 season was granted a work permit for 1996, signing for Oxford Cheetahs. He went on to ride for several teams in the years that followed, and by 2003 improved to heat leader standard with Somerset Rebels. Successful seasons followed with Exeter Falcons (with whom he won the Premier Trophy) and Stoke Potters (where he won the Pride of the Potters individual meeting in 2004) before signing for Reading Racers in 2006, going on to act as team captain. He captained Newport Wasps in 2009 before losing his place in the team mid-season. More recently he has been one of the top riders in the Newcastle Diamonds Premier League team (also captaining the team) as well as having spells in the Elite League with Swindon and Belle Vue Aces. Initially on loan form parent club Poole Pirates, lemon was signed on a full transfer by Diamonds in 2010. With Newcastle he won the Premier Trophy and the League play-offs in 2010 and the Premier Shield in 2011. He suffered several injuries in his time with the Diamonds, including several crushed vertebrae sustained in the 2009/10 Australian final, and several shoulder injuries. In December 2012 he signed to ride for Plymouth Devils in 2013.

In 2009 a 20th anniversary testimonial meeting was held at Somerset's Oaktree Arena between an Australia Select and a Rest of the World Select.

Lemon has represented Australia on several occasions, making his debut for his country in July 1997 against England.

In 2022, Lemon managed the Belle Vue Aces to their first league title since 1993.

Family
Lemon's father-in-law is the former rider Tom Owen.

Major titles and placings

Individual
Australian Under-16 Championship: 3rd (1988)
Victorian Championship: 1992/3, 1995/6, 2011/12
Australian Championship: 2nd (2000)

Team
British League Division Two: 1990 (Poole)
Premier Trophy: 2004 (Exeter), 2010 (Newcastle)
Premier League: 2010 (Newcastle)
Premier Shield: 2011 (Newcastle)

References

1973 births
Living people
Australian speedway riders
Poole Pirates riders
Middlesbrough Bears riders
Oxford Cheetahs riders
Eastbourne Eagles riders
Somerset Rebels riders
Newport Wasps riders
Exeter Falcons riders
Stoke Potters riders
Reading Racers riders
Newcastle Diamonds riders
Swindon Robins riders
Belle Vue Aces riders
Individual Speedway Long Track World Championship riders